August Wilhelm Hupel ( in Buttelstedt near Weimar –  in Paide) was a Baltic German publicist, estophile and linguist.

In 1766–1767, he translated for Lühhike öppetus, the first Estonian language periodical publication, edited by Peter Ernst Wilde.  In 1771, he published a medical textbook, Arsti ramat nende juhhatamisseks kes tahtvad többed ärra-arvada ning parrandada (Estonian for Manual of medical diagnostics and healthcare, literally Doctor's book to instruct those who want to guess and repair ailments).

In 1780, Hupel completed a treatise on Estonian grammar, Ehstnische Sprachlehre für beide Hauptdialekte, den revalschen und den dörptschen, nebst einem vollständigen Wörterbuch.  First printing of the included dictionary contained around 17,000 words and description of their morphology.  The second printing, printed in 1820, had grown to around 20,000 words.

Sources 
 Weissenstein Society: August Wilhelm Hupel
 EEVA entry: August Wilhelm Hupel ( * 25.02.1737 - † 07.02.1819 ) - Publitsist, kodu-uurija, keelemees, vaimulik

1737 births
1819 deaths
People from Buttelstedt
People from Saxe-Weimar
18th-century Estonian people
18th-century German people
Linguists from Estonia
Linguists from Germany
Baltic-German people
People from Paide
Estophiles
Estonian publishers (people)